Elzasonan (CP-448,187) is a selective 5-HT1B and 5-HT1D receptor antagonist that was under development by Pfizer for the treatment of depression but was discontinued, possibly due to poor efficacy. By preferentially blocking 5-HT1B and 5-HT1D autoreceptors, elzasonan is thought to enhance serotonergic innervations originating from the raphe nucleus, thereby improving signaling to limbic regions like the hippocampus and prefrontal cortex and ultimately resulting in antidepressant effects.

See also 
 GR-127,935
 SB-649,915

References 

Abandoned drugs
5-HT1 antagonists
Piperazines
Thiomorpholines
Lactams
Chloroarenes